Mateusz Damięcki (born 19 May 1981) is a Polish actor. He has appeared in more than 30 films and television shows since 1993.

Selected filmography
Karol: A Man Who Became Pope (2005)
Jutro idziemy do kina (2007)
Remembrance (2011)

References

External links

1981 births
Living people
Polish male film actors
20th-century Polish male actors
21st-century Polish male actors
Male actors from Warsaw
Aleksander Zelwerowicz National Academy of Dramatic Art in Warsaw alumni